Return of a Stranger is a 1961 British thriller film directed by Max Varnel and starring John Ireland, Susan Stephen, Cyril Shaps and Timothy Beaton.

Plot
The quiet suburban world of Pam and John Allen is shattered when a strange man begins stalking them with late night phone calls and sudden disturbing appearances. It emerges that the man, Homer Trent, was a part of Pam's teenage past at an orphanage. He was besotted with her then, and was eventually imprisoned for her rape. Now free, Trent is intent on claiming Pam.

Cast
 John Ireland - John Allen
 Susan Stephen - Pam Allen
 Cyril Shaps - Homer Trent
 Timothy Beaton - Tommy Allen
 Patrick McAlinney - Whittaker
 Kevin Stoney - Wayne
 Ian Fleming - Meecham
 Raymond Rollett - Somerset
 Frederick Piper - Fred
 Martin Carthy - Lift Boy

Critical reception
Britmovie called Return of a Stranger a "Creepy yet risible Brian Clemens scripted quota-quickie thriller from low-budget specialists the Danziger Brothers"; while TV Guide gave it two out of four stars, and called it a "Creepy, very suspenseful thriller...Taut direction by Varnel and good performances from the principals make this one memorable."

References

External links
 

1961 films
British thriller films
Films directed by Max Varnel
1960s thriller films
Films shot at New Elstree Studios
1960s English-language films
1960s British films